Comerio is a comune (Municipality) in the Province of Varese in the Italian region Lombardy, located about 50 km northwest of Milan and about 8 km west of Varese. As of 31 December 2004, it had a population of 2,549 and an area of 5.6 km².

The Municipality of Comerio contains the frazioni (subdivisions, mainly villages and hamlets) Muro, Orocco, Picco, Mattello, Cugnolo, and Vigne.

Comerio borders the following municipalities: Barasso, Castello Cabiaglio, Cuvio, Gavirate.

Demographic evolution

References

External links
 Commune of Comerio 

Cities and towns in Lombardy